The Castrol Six Hour was a motorcycle race for production motorcycles, held in Australia from 1970 through to 1987.

History
The race was run by the Willoughby District Motorcycle Club and held at Amaroo Park until 1983, when it was moved to Oran Park for 1984 until the final race in 1987. At the time it was the biggest and most prestigious bike meeting in Australia, enjoying huge support from not only Castrol and much of the motorcycle trade, but also was a great hit with the motorcycle community who saw it as a real test of the motorcycles they might wish to buy. The main character of the race being the bikes had to be stock and were rigorously inspected to ensure they were. It also had considerable television coverage and either contributed to or was the result of a motorcycle sales boom. The 6 Hour was so important to the industry, Honda designed the CB 1100R(B), to win the race. The first model had no fairing and is totally hand made.

Originally the race was called the Castrol 1000 in recognition of the prize money on offer from Castrol. $1000 was a considerable sum in 1970 as can be seen by the fact that the eventual winning bike in the first race, a Triumph Bonneville 650, could be purchased for around $1,150.00 at the time.

At first the race was for 3 classes, Unlimited, 500 cc and 250 cc.  The race continued in that format until 1975, when the 250 cc class was dropped for "rider safety". Then in 1978 the 500 cc class was dropped and a 750 cc class introduced. For 1983 The maximum capacity was limited to 1000 cc, probably to comply with the ACCA regulations and in 1987 a 250 cc class was reintroduced.

The first race was run on Sunday, 18 October 1970, when 68 riders lined up for the Le Mans start. Thirteen riders dropped their machines in the first four laps.

Honda 750s filled nine of the top ten places in 1971. Tony Hatton and Paul Spooner came second on a Yamaha 650. The heavy and powerful Hondas were all expected to stop for tyre changes. Hatton and Spooner moved up in the placings as each Honda stopped to change tyres. They realised too late that Brian Hindle and Clive Knight were planning to finish the race without changing tyres. Despite Haton's and Spooner's efforts, they were unable to catch the Honda. Yamaha subsequently advertised that its 650 was quicker than nine out of ten superbikes.

The 1972 race ended in controversy with Joe Eastmure initially being declared winner on a 315 cc Suzuki 350. Two hours later Kawasaki 750 riders Mike Steele and Dave Burgess, who had crashed four minutes before the finish, were declared winners. A protest was lodged against them on the grounds that they had returned to the circuit without making a pit stop for a safety inspection. Eastmure's bike was later disqualified for not having a horn. He returned in 1973 riding the same bike (with horn) and placed outright sixth, winning the 500 cc class.

In the 1974 race BMW R90 riders Bryan Hindle and Clive Knight were initially declared winners. Kawasaki Z1-900 riders Len Atlee and Ken Blake were declared winners after a recount. Another Kawasaki was disqualified for petrol tank modifications. Two BMW teams would have placed second and third, but were disqualified for suspension modifications. Yamaha RD-350 riders Barry Lemon/David Robbins won the 500 cc class with 333 laps, followed by Kawasaki H1-500 riders Peter Stronach and Jeff Sim (331 laps) and Honda CB-500 riders Lynton Carle and Otto Muller (330 laps). 250cc class winners (subject to the outcome of protests) were Lee Roebuck/Jeff Parkin (Yamaha RD-250) 326 laps, followed by Vaughan Coburn/Ron Burke (Suzuki GT-250) 326 laps and Terry Brown/Paul Grayden (Yamaha RD-250) 325 laps. Kawasaki 750 rider Warren Willing was disqualified For alleged gearbox irregularities.

The end came partly because of Castrol pulling out of road racing to concentrate its efforts on initially the Mr Motocross Series and then V8 Supercars, and partly because of controversy that had dogged the event since the start over eligibility of bikes or components. Also races for production bikes were losing support as more people moved to the new Superbikes. The move to Oran Park was also not popular with many fans.

There have been attempts to revive the idea of a six-hour endurance race, including one at Phillip Island, one at Eastern Creek and two at Oran Park in the 1990s and early 2000s but none met with the success of the original six-hour.

Star riders
Many famous names competed in the event, such as Mike (the bike) Hailwood (UK), Wes Cooley (USA), John Kocinski (USA), Ken Blake, Robert Holden and Graeme Crosby (NZ Kawasaki). Winners of the event include a virtual "who's who" of Australian motorcycle racing during the 1970s and 1980s, including Rob Phillis (Mick Hone Suzuki), Andrew Johnson (Mentor Motorcycles-Honda), Warren Willing (Team Yamaha), Wayne Gardner (Team Honda), Gregg Hansford (Team Kawasaki), Michael Dowson, Malcolm Campbell (Team Honda) and Kevin Magee (TZ750), Michael Cole (Team Honda), Malcolm Campbell (Team Honda).    A host a privateers contested the 6-hour putting them on even (horsepower) footing with factory backed racers.

Results

References

External links
 
 
 
  

Motorcycle races
Motorsport competitions in Australia
Motorsport in New South Wales